In the morning of October 20, 2017, an unnamed 14-year-old student of the private school Goyases, in the Brazilian Goiás state capital Goiânia, opened fire against his classmates with a .40-caliber Taurus PT100 pistol, leaving two dead, and four injured.

He tried to commit suicide but was convinced not to by a school teacher, being arrested minutes after the incident.

In testimony to the local police, he claimed he had been inspired by the Columbine High School massacre in Colorado, US, and the Realengo school shooting in Rio de Janeiro. The police investigation stated that the student suffered bullying from his classmates.

Shooting 
Around 11:50 am, during the break between classes, the student was in the classroom with a pistol inside a backpack. He drew his gun and then started shooting, killing his colleagues João Pedro Calembo and João Vitor Gomes, and injuring four others, with one girl becoming paraplegic. The weapon, a .40 caliber Taurus PT100 pistol, belonged to his mother who, like his father, is a military police officer.

Further tragedy was prevented thanks to the intervention of the coordinator Simone Maulaz Elteto, who entered the room, at the moment when there were only the shooter and three fallen students, two of whom were already supposedly dead. According to her, there were other rooms with students, with the risk that he would cause more victims or commit suicide. Simone was able to persuade the shooter to accompany her to the library, where she was able to calm him down until he dropped the gun. At that moment, police officers entered the library and managed to arrest the boy.

Aftermath
The case had international repercussions. The Government of Goiás declared official mourning for three days.

Conviction
On the afternoon of Saturday, October 21, the Public Prosecutor's Office of the State of Goiás recommended the provisional hospitalization for 45 days of the perpetrator, and hours later, the judge on duty Mônica Cézar Moreno Senhorello accepted the request. On November 28, Justice sentenced the young man to three years in hospital, the maximum penalty provided for by the ECA.

In May 2020, he was released.

See also
Suzano school shooting
Campinas Cathedral shooting
Janaúba massacre

References

School shootings in Brazil
School shootings committed by pupils
Mass shootings in Brazil
Murder in Brazil
2017 murders in Brazil
2017 mass shootings in South America
Attacks in South America in 2017